Uma is an 2021 Indian Bengali Language Sport Drama television series which is broadcast on Bengali General Entertainment Channel Zee Bangla and is also available on the digital platform ZEE5 even before TV telecast. It stars Shinjinee Chakraborty and Neel Bhattacharya in the lead roles.It aired daily at 7PM(IST) Initially it scored very well in TRP charts but later its popularity declined and was replaced by Jagaddhatri It was premiered on 13 September 2021. The series is produced by Tent Cinema.

Plot
The story revolves around Uma who dreams of becoming a cricketer but is forced to give up on her dream due to familial obligations. However, her passion for the game and her husband Abhimanyu's constant motivation push her to realize her ambition and start playing cricket again.

Cast

Main 
 Shinjinee Chakraborty as Uma Acharya (née Das) - a cricketer, Abhi's wife, Aliya's former assistant,  Sunanda and Sutapa's daughter, Soma's younger sister and Chumki's elder sister
 Neel Bhattacharya as Abhimanyu Acharya aka Abhi - a Social worker and helper, Uma's husband, Aliya's former  fiancé, Amrita and Ambarish's Son, Anurag and Rikhiya's younger brother and Ishita's brother-in-law

Recurring
 Bhaskar Banerjee as Sunando Das: A pitch curator; Soma, Chumki and Uma's father and Sutapa's husband; Arabinda and Abhimanyu's father-in-law.
 Soma Banerjee as Sutapa Das: A housewife; Soma, Chumki and Uma's mother; late Sunando's wife; Arabinda and Abhimanyu's mother-in-law.
 Juiee Sarkar as Soma: Uma and Chumki's  elder sister; Sutapa and late Sunando's eldest daughter; Arabinda's wife; Abhimanyu's elder sister-in-law.
 Debopriya Basu as Chumki Das aka Chutki: Uma and Soma's younger sister; late Sutapa and late Sunando's youngest daughter; Arabinda and Abhimanyu's younger sister-in-law.
 Shritama Mitra as Aliya Acharya (née Bose): a renowned cricketer; Abhi's love interest and close friend; Tarulata and Sanjay's daughter; Rudra's wife; Himadri's daughter-in-law.
 Sourya Bhattacharya as Rudra Acharya: Himadri's son; Anurag, Rikhiya, and Abhimanyu's paternal cousin brother; Aliya's husband; Tarulata and Sanjay's son-in-law.
 Maitreyee Mitra as Amrita Acharya: Anurag, Rikhiya and Abhimanyu's mother, Ishita and Uma's mother-in-law, Ambarish's wife; Suktara, Himadri, Sekhor, and Piu's eldest sister-in-law.
 Bharat Kaul as Ambarish Acharya: Anurag, Rikhiya and Abhimanyu's father, Ishita and Uma's father-in-law, Amrita's husband; Suktara, Himadri, Sekhor, and Piu's eldest brother. 
 Subhosree Chakraborty as Rikhiya Acharya: Ambarish and Amrita's daughter; Anurag's younger sister; Abhimanyu's elder sister; Uma's elder sister-in-law.
 Vivaan Ghosh as Anurag Acharya aka Ani: Ishita's husband; Amrita and Ambarish's eldest son; Rikhiya and Abhimanyu's elder brother; Uma's elder brother-in-law; Mishti's father.
 Manosi Sengupta / Sudipta Banerjee / Tania Kar as Ishita Acharya: Anurag's wife; Rikhiya, Abhimanyu and Nandana's sister-in-law; Amrita and Ambarish's daughter-in-law; Mishti's mother.
 Avery Singha Roy as Joyeeta Acharya: Anurag, Rikhiya, and Abhimanyu's aunt; Sekhor's wife; Nandana's mother.
 Diganta Bagchi as Sekhor Acharya: Anurag, Rikhiya, and Abhimanyu's uncle; Joyeeta's husband; Nandana's father.
 Shriti Singh as Nandana Acharya: Anurag, Rikhiya, and Abhimanyu's younger paternal cousin sister; Joyeeta and Sekhor's only daughter.
 Amitabh Bhattacharjee as Himadri Acharya: Anurag, Rikhiya, and Abhimanyu's uncle.
 Basanti Chatterjee as Priyamvada Acharya: Anurag, Rikhiya, and Abhimanyu's grandmother; Ambarish, Suktara, Himadri, Sekhor and Piu's mother
 Chandicharan as Brahmapada Acharya: Anurag, Rikhiya, and Abhimanyu's grandfather; Priyamvada's husband; Ambarish, Suktara, Himadri, Sekhor and Piu's father.
 Nibedita Mukherjee as Suktara Gupta (née Acharya): Anurag, Rikhiya, and Abhimanyu's aunt; Somobroto's wife. She is a mother-figure to Abhi but Uma had a sour relation with her, which has absolutely changed.
 Surojit Banerjee as Somobroto Gupta: Anurag, Rikhiya, and Abhimanyu's uncle; Suktara's husband
 Reshmi Sen as Tarulata Bose: Sanjay's wife, Aliya's mother, Rudra's mother-in-law.
 Arindam Banerjee as Sanjay Bose: A corrupted politician; Tarulata's husband, Aliya's father, Rudra's father-in-law.
 Rimjhim Gupta as Swastika Chakrabarty (née Acharya) aka Piu: Anurag, Rikhiya, and Abhimanyu's aunt - Tapas's wife.
 Koushik Bhattacharya as Tapas Chakrabarty : Anurag, Rikhiya, and Abhimanyu's uncle - Piu's husband.
 Chandraniv Mukherjee as Arabindo: Abhimanyu's friend, Soma's husband, Uma and Chumki's brother-in-law.
 Dia Karmakar as Priya: Aliya's friend and Uma's rival.
 Rajiv Bose as Vikram Deb.

Reception

TRP ratings

References

External links 
 Uma at ZEE5

Bengali-language television programming in India
2021 Indian television series debuts
Zee Bangla original programming
Indian drama television series